ChesterBus was an English municipal bus company operating services in Cheshire. It was owned by the Chester City Council.

History
Chester City Transport commenced operating bus services in Chester in 1930. It was operated as part of Chester City Council. To comply with the Transport Act 1985, the bus operation was transferred to a separate company in 1986. It continued to trade as Chester City Transport until rebranded as ChesterBus in April 2005.

In July 2006, Chester City Council placed the business up for sale.

In October 2006, Arriva North West & Wales registered a network of services to commence in January 2007, which duplicated a number of ChesterBus's routes. On 11 October 2006, Chester City Council commenced an action in the High Court against Arriva, claiming that the registrations were anti-competitive under the Competition Act 1998, and asking for an injunction requiring Arriva to de-register them. In December, the registrations were cancelled though revised registrations for the 1/1A and 15 were made in January 2007.

The claim centred on the allegation that Arriva were abusing a dominant position, but in a judgement dated 15 June 2007, it was held that Arriva had not been demonstrated to hold a dominant position, and the claim was therefore dismissed.

On 19 June 2007, ChesterBus was sold to First Chester & The Wirral with 84 buses.

References

1930 establishments in England
2007 disestablishments in England
Former bus operators in Cheshire
British companies established in 1930
British companies disestablished in 2007